Gabriela Isabel de la Cruz Brito (born October 25, 1999) is a Venezuelan model, communicator and beauty pageant titleholder who was crowned as Miss Supranational Venezuela 2019. She represented the state of Carabobo at the pageant and represented Venezuela in Miss Supranational 2019 where she placed as the 4th Runner-Up.

Life and career

Early life
Cruz was born in San Felipe, Venezuela. He has a younger sister and is a student of Social Communication.

Pageantry
Gabriela entered in the world of beauty pageants very early on. In 2016 she became the Reina de la Feria de Mayo in her hometown, San Felipe, representing the Peña municipality.

Then she would participate on May 30, 2017 in the Miss Carabobo 2017 pageant, an event held at the Vesperia Hotel in Valencia, positioning herself as one of the finalists, with the aspiration of becoming a delegate of Miss Venezuela 2017.

Miss Supranational Venezuela 2019 
Subsequently, on June 26, 2019, Gabriela wearing the band of the Valencia municipality wins the Miss Earth Carabobo 2019, thus becoming one of the official candidates for both Miss Earth Venezuela and the inaugural Miss Supranational Venezuela competitions. On both occasions, Cruz represented the Carabobo state.

On August 22, 2019, at the Chacao Cultural Center in Caracas she was crowned by her predecessor, Nariman Battikha, as Miss Supranational Venezuela 2019. The honor roll consisted of the first Runner-Up, Ivana Rodriguez, Miss Supranational Capital District, and Maria Laura López, Miss Supranational Táchira, who was the second Runner-Up.

Having won the title as Miss Supranational Venezuela, Cruz did not participate in Miss Earth Venezuela 2019 competition, leaving the Carabobo state band vacant in said competition.

Miss Supranational 2019 
Gabriela represented Venezuela in the Miss Supranational 2019 pageant, which was held on December 6, 2019 at the Katowice International Congress Center, in Katowice, Poland, where she finished as the 4th Runner-Up. This is the highest position achieved by Venezuela since Valeria Vespoli in 2016 as 1st Runner-Up.

References

External links
 

1999 births
Living people
Miss Venezuela winners
People from San Felipe, Venezuela
Venezuelan female models